The New South Wales Women's Open is a women's professional golf tournament to be held near Queanbeyan in Australia. It was first played on the ALPG Tour in 2006. Since 2018, the tournament is co-sanctioned by the Ladies European Tour.

Winners

References

External links

ALPG Tour events
Ladies European Tour events
Golf tournaments in Australia